Coleophora quadruplex is a moth of the family Coleophoridae. It is found in North America, including Nova Scotia, Illinois, Maine, Massachusetts and New York.

The larvae feed on the seeds of Achillea species, including Achillea millefolium. They create a trivalved, tubular silken case.

References

quadruplex
Moths of North America
Moths described in 1940